Agriophanes is a genus of moths belonging to the subfamily Olethreutinae of the family Tortricidae, with a single species found in India.

Species
Agriophanes pycnostrota Meyrick, 1930

See also
List of Tortricidae genera

References

External links
tortricidae.com

Tortricidae genera
Taxa named by Edward Meyrick
Monotypic moth genera
Moths of Asia
Olethreutinae